Cape figwort may refer to plants in the genus Phygelius:

Phygelius
Phygelius aequalis
Phygelius capensis